Achille Coser (born 14 July 1982) is an Italian football goalkeeper.

Career

AlbinoLeffe
Coser was signed by AlbinoLeffe in  He worked as Paolo Acerbis' backup except 2005–06 season which Acerbis left the club on loan in exchange with Paolo Ginestra.

In summer 2006 the club signed Federico Marchetti, which saw Coser became 3rd goalkeeper. In January 2007 he was signed by Pergocrema in temporary deal.

In January 2008, Acerbis left for Triestina and Coser became Marchetti's backup. Coser made 11 appearances in 2007–08 Serie B (all in the second half of season), as the holder of no.1 shirt.

In summer 2008, Marchetti left for Cagliari, and Coser became new signing Antonio Narciso's backup. He was released for free in June 2009.

Pro Belvedere Vercelli
He signed for Lega Pro Seconda Divisione outfit Pro Belvedere in January 2010.

Ascoli
In 2010, he was signed by Ascoli on a two-year contract.

Novara
In 2011, he was signed by Novara along with Simone Pesce, for free and €150,000 respectively. On the next day Novara also signed Luigi Giorgi for €1.6 million.

Vicenza
In 2012, he was signed by Vicenza on a three-year contract, with Alessandro Bastrini moved to opposite direction. The club also signed Alex Pinardi from Novara, and sent Alain Baclet to Novara. All 4 players were valued for €1 million accounting value, thus no cash were involved in the swap deals. The club relegated at the end of season.

Cesena
In 2013, he returned to Serie B for Cesena, with Nicola Ravaglia moved to Veneto. At Cesena, Coser was ahead Andrea Rossini, Andrea Campagnolo and Federico Agliardi as first choice for most of the season. In the promotion playoffs both Agliardi and Coser had played.

Livorno
On 13 August 2014 he was signed by Livorno on free transfer.

AlbinoLeffe
Coser joined AlbinoLeffe on 12 August 2016.

References

External links
 Profile at Legaseriea.it
 

1982 births
Sportspeople from the Province of Bergamo
Living people
Italian footballers
Association football goalkeepers
U.C. AlbinoLeffe players
U.S. Pergolettese 1932 players
F.C. Pro Vercelli 1892 players
Ascoli Calcio 1898 F.C. players
Novara F.C. players
L.R. Vicenza players
A.C. Cesena players
U.S. Livorno 1915 players
Virtus Entella players
F.C. Südtirol players
Serie A players
Serie B players
Serie C players
Serie D players
A.S.D. La Biellese players
Footballers from Lombardy